László Kovács may refer to:

People
László Kovács (actor) (born 1978), Peruvian actor
László Kovács (canoeist), Hungarian sprint canoeist who competed in the 1950s
László Kovács (cinematographer) (1933–2007), Hollywood cinematographer originally from Hungary
László Kovács (politician) (born 1939), Hungarian diplomat formerly represented his country in the European Commission
László Kovács (physician) (1941–2001), Hungarian X-ray physician, Member of Parliament for Érd (1990–1994)
László Kovács (writer) (born 1950), Hungarian writer
László Kovács (footballer) (1951–2017), Hungarian footballer who represented his country in the 1978 FIFA World Cup
Laszlo Kovacs (wrestler) (born 1971), Australian Greco-Roman wrestler

Characters
 Name of Jean Paul Belmondo's character in the 1959 film A Double Tour (Web of Passion), by Claude Chabrol
 Michel Poiccard (played by Jean Paul Belmondo) in the 1960 film Breathless, who uses the name "László Kovács" as an alias
Laszlo Kovacs, a background character in the Clive Cussler novel Polar Shift